Buggerru is a comune (municipality) in the Province of South Sardinia in the Italian region Sardinia, located about  northwest of Cagliari and about  northwest of Carbonia.

Derek Jarman's 1976 film Sebastiane was shot near the comune.

Buggerru borders the following municipalities: Fluminimaggiore, Iglesias.

References

Cities and towns in Sardinia
1960 establishments in Italy
States and territories established in 1960
Populated places established in 1864